D-Day: America Invades is a 1995 computer wargame developed by Atomic Games and published by Avalon Hill for IBM PC compatibles. It is the third game in the World at War series, following Operation Crusader and World at War: Stalingrad.

Gameplay
Set in World War II, D-Day: America Invades is a computer wargame that simulates D-Day and the following fight for territorial advantages.

Development
As a consequence of Atomic Games' split with Avalon Hill in September 1995, D-Day: America Invades was the two companies' last game together. According to Alan Emrich of Computer Gaming World, Atomic's Keith Zabalaoui called this "purely a business decision" and clarified that there was no ill will between the companies.

Reception

D-Day: America Invades sold fewer than 50,000 units globally. This was part of a trend for Avalon Hill games during the period; Terry Coleman of Computer Gaming World wrote in late 1998 that "no AH game in the past five years" had reached the mark.

Next Generation reviewed the PC version of the game, rating it four stars out of five, and stated that "Atomic Games manages to take much of the tedium out of this tile-based wargame, enabling you to concentrate on strategy as you try to duplicate history, or if you're playing as the Nazis, change it." William R. Trotter wrote for PC Gamer US, "Hats off, ladies and gents: a classic is born. Wargames just don’t get any better than this."

Reviews
Imperium Gier (Sep 01, 1999)

References

External links
D-Day: America Invades

1995 video games
Atomic Games games
Avalon Hill video games
Computer wargames
DOS games
DOS-only games
Turn-based strategy video games
Video games developed in the United States
World War II video games